Lily Ann Granderson (1816-1889), was an American educator. She was born a slave in Virginia in 1816. She was a pioneering educator who taught other enslaved people how to read and influenced the founding of Jackson State University.

Early life 
Lily Ann Granderson's grandmother was a free woman of Native American descent. After she died, Granderson's mother was sold into slavery at three years of age. Little is known about Granderson's father, except that he was a white man from one of the First Families of Virginia (FFV). Later, after she had given birth to Granderson, her mother moved to Kentucky where Granderson began work as a house slave. Granderson and the master's family became close, and the master's children even taught her how to read and write, a common method used by enslaved people to gain literacy.

When her master died, Granderson was shipped down to Mississippi where she was sold to another slave master. On this plantation, Granderson worked in the fields, causing her to fall ill. She requested to be removed from the field and placed somewhere where the work would not put a strain on her health. The slave master granted her permission to work in the kitchen at his home. In this position, Granderson was required to make a trip into town from the plantation every day, as the slave master's home was not located directly on the plantation but in town. It was during this time that Granderson opened up her school for enslaved peoples.

Contributions and legacy 
Granderson used her trips into town to start her school for slaves. It was against the law in Mississippi to educate slaves out of fear of rebels and runaways. To get around this law, Granderson held classes late at night, when enslaved children could sneak out to attend class. Class size was limited to twelve children at a time. After the children had learned how to read and write, they "graduated," making room for twelve more children. Granderson operated this class for about seven years without being discovered.

Word eventually got out about this late-night class for slaves, but there was not a penalty for Granderson's actions. Although there was a law against the education of slaves, there was a loophole in this Mississippi law that applied to Granderson's case. While it was against Mississippi law for white people and free slaves to educate another slave, the law did not forbid one slave educating another slave. As a result of this, Granderson recovered from this setback and opened a Sabbath school in addition to her late-night school. Through her efforts, hundreds of students became literate and were able to use their literacy to acquire freedom.

She is also accredited with heavily influencing the creation of what is today Jackson State University (formerly known as Natchez Seminary). At 54 years of age, she became one of the first African-Americans to open an account at the Freedman's Bank.

Personal life 
Granderson was married to Oliver Granderson and had two children. After her death in 1889, she was buried in Natchez City Cemetery.

References 

Laura S. Haviland, A Woman's Life-Work: Labors and Experiences of Laura S. Haviland (by the author, 1881; reprint, Salem, New Hampshire: AYER Co., 1984), 300–301.
David Freedman, "African-American Schooling in the South Prior to 1861," The Journal of Negro History 84 (Winter, 1999), 21.

1816 births
19th-century American slaves
19th-century African-American women
Educators from Virginia
19th-century American women educators
African-American educators
1889 deaths
Educators from Mississippi
Literacy advocates
19th-century American educators